59th parallel may refer to:

59th parallel north, a circle of latitude in the Northern Hemisphere
59th parallel south, a circle of latitude in the Southern Hemisphere